Grande-Rivière (Great River) or variation, may refer to:

Canada

New Brunswick
 Big Tracadie River (French: Grande rivière Tracadie), a river in northeastern New Brunswick
 Grande Rivière, a river in northwestern New Brunswick formerly known as the Grand River

Nova Scotia
 Grande-Rivière (Cap-Breton), an Acadian community in Cape Breton Regional Municipality

Nunavik
Grande Rivière de la Baleine (Great Whale River)

Quebec
La Grande River, a river in Baie-James, Nord-du-Quebec
 Grande-Rivière, Quebec, a city in Le Rocher-Percé Regional County Municipality, Gaspésie–Îles-de-la-Madeleine
Grande-Rivière railway station, in the above municipality
 Grande-Rivière, a tributary of Baie-des-Chaleurs in Le Rocher-Percé Regional County Municipality, Gaspésie–Îles-de-la-Madeleine
 Zec de la Grande-Rivière, a controlled harvested area in Le Rocher-Percé Regional County Municipality, Gaspésie–Îles-de-la-Madeleine
 La Grande-Rivière, a river in Havre-Saint-Pierre, Minganie Regional County Municipality, Côte-Nord
 Grande Rivière (Ouelle River tributary), a river in Saint-Gabriel-Lalemant, Kamouraska Regional County Municipality, Bas-Saint-Laurent
 La Grande-Rivière, a river in Saint-Pierre-de-l'Île-d'Orléans, Capitale-Nationale
 La Grande Rivière Airport, in Radisson

Caribbean
Grande Rivière de l'Anse la Raye, in Anse la Ray District, Saint Lucia
Grande Rivière, Dennery, in Dennery District, Saint Lucia
Grande-Rivière, Gros-Islet, in Gros Islet District, Saint Lucia
Grande-Rivière-du-Nord, commune of north department in Haiti, birthplace of the Jean Jacques Dessalines, one of the forefathers of the Haitian Republic
Grande-Rivière-du-Nord Arrondissement, in Haiti
Grande Rivière de Nippes, commune of Nippes department in Haiti
Grande Rivière de Jacmel, in Haiti
Grand'Rivière, a village in Martinique
Grande Rivière (Martinique), a river with mouth near the village
Grande Riviere, in Trinidad

France
Grande-Rivière, Jura, a commune in the region of Franche-Comté
Grande-Rivière Château, a commune in the Jura department in Bourgogne-Franche-Comté in eastern France

United States
Grande Rivière Noire (Big Black River), in Maine
Grand Riviera Theater, in Detroit, Michigan

See also
 Grand River (disambiguation)